A Tale of the Australian Bush is a 1911 Australian silent film directed by Gaston Mervale. Set in colonial Australia, it was also known as Ben Hall, the Notorious Bushranger and is considered a lost film.

Plot
The story of the bushranger Ben Hall, including his duel with Melville, last stand and death. A contemporary review said that "unlike the usual bushranging films, instead of glorifying the villainy of the criminals of the bush, recorded a triumph of the law over the lawless."

Cast
 A.J. Patrick as Ben Hall
 Godfrey Cassas Melville
 Harry Beaumont as Gilbert
 James Martin as Keightley
 Gilbert Emery as chief of police
 Harrie Ireland as Mrs Keightley
 Isma Owe and Robbie Hall
 Louise Carbasse as Mrs Hall

Production
It was the first film from the production company Australian Life Biograph Company.

Release
The film was first released in Sydney as Ben Hall, the Notorious Bushranger before being screened nationally under the other title.

References

External links
 

1911 films
1911 Western (genre) films
1911 drama films
1911 lost films
Australian black-and-white films
Australian drama films
Bushranger films
Films set in colonial Australia
Lost Australian films
Lost Western (genre) films
Lost drama films
Silent Australian Western (genre) films
Films directed by Gaston Mervale
Silent drama films